Golden Globe Award for Best Actress can refer to:

Golden Globe Award for Best Actress – Miniseries or Television Film,
Golden Globe Award for Best Actress – Motion Picture Drama,
Golden Globe Award for Best Actress – Motion Picture Musical or Comedy, 
Golden Globe Award for Best Actress – Television Series Drama, or
Golden Globe Award for Best Actress – Television Series Musical or Comedy